Smugglers is an upcoming South Korean film directed by Ryoo Seung-wan, starring Kim Hye-soo, Yum Jung-ah, Zo In-sung, Park Jeong-min, Kim Jong-soo, and Go Min-si. It is scheduled to be released theatrically in the summer of 2023.

Synopsis 
Set in the 1970s, the story revolves around an action crime of haenyeo who gets caught up in smuggling against the background of a peaceful small sea village.

Cast 

 Kim Hye-soo
 Yum Jung-ah
 Zo In-sung
 Park Jeong-min
 Kim Jong-soo
 Go Min-si

Production 
Principal photography began on June 5, 2021.

References

External links 
 
 

2023 films
2020s South Korean films
2020s Korean-language films
Films directed by Ryoo Seung-wan
South Korean crime action films
Next Entertainment World films